Stenorhopalus rubriceps is a species of beetle in the family Cerambycidae. It was described by Émile Blanchard in 1851.

References

Beetles described in 1851
Necydalinae